The Olympique Lyonnais Reserves & Academy are the reserve team and academy of French club Olympique Lyonnais. The reserves squad play in the Championnat National 2, the fourth division of French football and the highest division the team is allowed to participate in. Lyon have won the reserves title of the Championnat de France amateur six times. They have won in 1998, 2001, 2003, 2006, and 2009, and 2010.

The U-19 squad participates in their weekly league, the Championnat National Under-19, which is a league comprising four groups of fourteen clubs who play each other twice during the regular season. This session is dubbed Phase 1. Following the regular season, the four group winners are randomly selected to face each other in semi-final matches (dubbed Phase 2) to decide who will play each other in the Under-18 Championnat National championship match, usually held in Mayenne. There is also a third-place match, which is usually held just before the championship match. The Under-18 squad also regularly participates in the Coupe Gambardella. They have won the title on 4 occasions. They won the cup in 1971, 1994, 1997 and 2022.

The U-17 side participates in a league, the Championnat National Under-17, which is a youth league comprising six groups of twelve clubs who play each other twice during the regular season, which is dubbed Phase 1. Following the regular season, the six group winners and the two best second place clubs are randomly inserting into two groups of four, where they play each other at neutral venues once over a span of four days. This portion is dubbed Phase 2. The two winners of each group will then face each other in the championship match to determine the champion of the Under-17 Championnat National. The Under-17 squad also participates in regional cup competitions.

The current National 2 manager is Gueida Fofana, who played for Olympique Lyonnais before but had his career cut-short due to injuries. He has been the National 2 team manager since 2019. The manager of the Olympique Lyonnais U-19s and U-17s are Eric Hély, and Amaury Barlet.

Players

Reserve squad (Olympique Lyonnais II)
As of 29 January 2023

U19 squad

U17 squad

Notable academy players 

Since the 2010s, Lyon youth academy gained reputation all around Europe as being one of the top football academies in the continent, producing several players playing in European top tier competitions. Between 2012 and 2019, Lyon appears successively eight times in top 4 of the International Centre for Sports Studies list of the best football academies in Europe. Lyon was also rated by the French Football Federation as the best football academy in France for six seasons in a row, between 2013 and 2019.

In February 2014, L'Équipe writes that Olympique Lyonnais ranks second in terms of the number of players trained at the club and playing in the "five major European championships" (Germany, England, Spain, France and Italy) tied with Real Madrid, and the first being FC Barcelona. In 2015, France Football rated Lyon youth academy as one of the best in Europe, as it is used to feed the first team, and also having a pool of players with value on the transfer market, without this being in the heart of the club's policy. Indeed, the competition level in Lyon's youth team is very difficult for young players, they will regularly, voluntarily or not, emancipate themselves in other very young clubs. Just as regularly, a certain number of them manage to have a good national or international career.

According to Faouzi Djedou-Benabid, the scout for Niort and the co-author of Pourquoi le foot français va dans le mur (Why French football goes into wall) (2015), published by Hugo Sport, the training provided by Olympique Lyonnais favors the technical learning of football over match results, like FC Barcelona: thus, "Lyon educators do not hesitate to have defenders play in midfield so that 'they can learn to use their feet better". In addition, the formation does not favor any pattern of play, allowing the players to adapt easily to all positions during the game. Below is a non-exhaustive list of notable players who trained in the youth teams of Olympique Lyonnais:

France
 Loïc Abenzoar
 Ghislain Anselmini
 Houssem Aouar
 Marcel Aubour
 Sofian Augarreau
 Farès Bahlouli
 Mohamed Bahlouli
 Patrick Baldassara
 Florent Balmont
 Bradley Barcola
 Melvin Bard
 Cédric Bardon
 Xavier Barrau
 Christian Bassila
 Karim Belhocine
 Olivier Bellisi
 Nicolas Belvito
 Hatem Ben Arfa
 Mourad Benhamida
 Farid Benstiti
 Karim Benzema
 Bryan Bergougnoux
 Jean-Paul Bernad
 Olivier Bernard
 Jérémy Berthod
 Alexandre Bès
 Grégory Bettiol
 Romain Beynié
 Maxime Blanc
 Gilbert Bonvin
 Pierre Bouby
 Jérémie Bréchet
 Christophe Breton
 Anthony Briançon
 Franck Burnier
 Maxence Caqueret
 Alexis Carra
 Alain Caveglia
 Johann Charpenet
 Mickael Charvet
 Yves Chauveau
 Xavier Chavalerin
 Pierre Chavrondier
 Jean-Claude Chemier
 Rayan Cherki
 Serge Chiesa
 François Clerc
 Jérémy Clément
 Timothé Cognat
 Renaud Cohade
 Alain Colacicco
 Mickaël Colloredo
 Néstor Combin
 Gilles Constantinian
 Yoann Court
 Laurent Courtois
 Florent Da Silva
 Houcama Essiaf
 Stéphane Darbion
 Maxime D'Arpino
 Romain Dedola
 Romain Del Castillo
 Sylvain Deplace
 Paul Devarrewaere
 Jean-Christophe Devaux
 Fleury Di Nallo
 Jean Djorkaeff
 Albert Domenech
 Raymond Domenech
 Issiar Dramé
 Roger Duffez
 Jean Dumas
 Jean-Philippe Durand
 Franck Durix
 Alan Dzabana
 Modeste Duku
 Mohamed El Arouch
 Sébastien Faure
 Julien Faussurier
 Nabil Fekir
 Yassin Fekir
 Olivier Ferez
 Jordan Ferri
 Bernard Ferrigno
 Fabrice Fiorèse
 Maxence Flachez
 Sébastien Flochon
 Frédéric Fouret
 Laurent Fournier
 Mickael Fourtier
 Joël Fréchet
 Pascal Fugier
 Jairzino Fumont
 Rémi Garde
 Jordy Gaspar
 Bruno Génésio
 Alexis Genet
 Guy Genet
 Gaël Genevier
 Willem Geubbels
 Ludovic Giuly
 Jacques Glyczinski
 Yohan Gomez
 Maxime Gonalons
 Mathieu Gorgelin
 Amine Gouiri
 Hérold Goulon
 Sidney Govou
 Dorian Grange
 Fabrice Grange
 Clément Grenier
 Sébastien Grimaldi
 Malo Gusto
 Joan Hartock
 Alexandre Hauw
 David Hellebuyck
 Nassim Innocenti
 René Izquierdo
 Kévin Jacmot
 Warren Jacmot
 Franck Jurietti
 Aldo Kalulu
 Pierre Kalulu
 Olivier Kemen
 Timothée Kolodziejczak
 Billy Koumetio
 Zakarie Labidi
 Alexandre Lacazette
 Bernard Lacombe
 Guillaume Lacour
 Gérard Lanthier
 Florent Laville
 Esteban Lepaul
 William Le Pogam
 Bernard Lhomme
 David Linarès
 Irvyn Lomani
 Castello Lukeba
 Steed Malbranque
 Elefterios Manolios
 Jérémy Manzorro
 Myziane Maolida
 Dominique Marais
 Lucas Margueron
 Alexis Martial
 Anthony Martial
 Théo Ndicka Matam
 Boris Mathis
 Dominique Marais
 Florian Maurice
 Jonathan Mendes
 Julian Michel
 Lucas Mocio
 Patrice Monteih
 Laurent Montoya
 Laurent Morestin
 Jean-Marc Moulin
 Anthony Mounier
 Louis Nganioni
 Bruno Ngotty
 Camille Ninel

 Jean-Jacques Nono
 Robert Nouzaret
 Harry Novillo
 Gael Nsombi
 Alain Olio
 Patrick Paillot
 Sandy Paillot
 Julian Palmieri
 Denis Papas
 Frédéric Patouillard
 Mathieu Patouillet
 Mour Paye
 Gaëtan Perrin
 Jacques Philip
 Jérémy Pied
 Lenny Pintor
 Alassane Pléa
 Damien Plessis
 Georges Prost
 Grégoire Puel
 Paulin Puel
 Nicolas Puydebois
 Daniel Ravier
 Enzo Reale
 Loïc Rémy
 Remy Riou
 Claude-Arnaud Rivenet
 Thomas Robinet

 Stéphane Roche
 Steven Roux
 Mathieu Salamand
 Junior Sambia
 Mamadou Sarr
 Romain Sartre
 Ernest Schultz
 Nicolas Seguin
 Yoan Severin
 Stéphane Solomenko
 Yaya Soumaré
 Éric Spadiny
 Julien Stephan
 Éric Taborda
 Riad Tahar
 Kevin Tapoko
 Hermann Tebily
 Alain Thiry
 Titouan Thomas
 Corentin Tolisso
 Johann Truchet
 Samuel Umtiti
 Cédric Uras
 Pierrick Valdivia
 Robert Valette
 Julien Viale
 Quentin Vieira
 Hugo Vogel
 Daniel Xuereb
 Yoan Zouma

Africa
 Amin Al Aid
 Ishak Belfodil
 Nassim Benaissa
 Yassine Benzia
 Abdelkader Ghezzal
 Rachid Ghezzal
 Yacine Hima
 Yanis Lagha
 Khaled Lemmouchia
 Karim Maroc
 Saïd Mehamha
 Yannis Tafer
 Mehdi Zeffane
 Nassim Zitouni
 Rashid Coulibaly
 Vincent Ye
 Yann Mabella
 Sinaly Diomandé
 Lossémy Karaboué
 Éric Tié Bi
 Raphaël Anaba
 Romarin Billong
 Joseph-Désiré Job
 Stanislas Lebongo
 Philippe N'Dioro
 Clinton N'Jie
 Moussa Djoumoi
 Faiz Mattoir

 Cyriaque Mayounga
 Dylan Mboumbouni
 Amos Youga
 Kelly Youga
 Gédéon Kalulu
 Yann Kitala
 Samuel Moutoussamy
 Isaac Hermans Arday
 Emmanuel Danso
 Elisha Owusu
 Celestino Iala
 Mouctar Diakhaby
 Sekou Yansané
 Mohamed Yattara
 Fabien Boyer
 Nicolas Fontaine
 Thomas Fontaine
 Jamal Alioui
 Achraf Laaziri
 Fahd Moufi
 Kays Ruiz-Atil
 Frédéric Kanouté
 Habib Keïta
 Sidy Koné
 Eric Descomdes
 Bryan Ngwabije
 Waly Diouf
 Lamine Gassama
 Abdoulaye Ndiaye
 Ousmane Ndiaye
 Bouna Sarr
 Mouhamadou-Naby Sarr
 Demba Touré
 Blaise Tohou-Ngague
 Sylvain Idangar
 Ludovic Assemoassa
 Malcolm Barcola
 Chaïm El Djebali
 Habib Oueslati
 Hamza Rafia

Rest of World
 Hamdan Al Kamali
 Théo Defourny
 Héritier Deyonge
 Foudil Idriss
 Camilo
 Zachary Brault-Guillard
 Jérémy Frick
 Jonathan Grossrieder
 Kilian Pagliuca
 Anthony Racioppi
 Kevin Tsimba
 Tao Jian
 Yu Junwei
 Zhang Xiuwei
 Téo Barisic
 Reo Griffiths
 Aleksandre Guruli
 Georges Mikautadze
 Mathieu Gadet
 Robert Cacchioni
 Francesco Migliore
 Kim Shin
 Philippe Paoli
 Christopher Martins Pereira
 Ulrik Yttergård Jenssen
 Tord Salte
 Bartosz Talar
 Mickael Almeida
 Anthony Lopes
 Melih Altikulac
 Semih Altikulac
 Hamdi Cam
 Cenk Özkaçar
 Axel Perez
|}

Players in bold are those who capped for their National team.

Honours
 Championnat de France Amateurs: 7
Champions: 1998, 2001, 2003, 2006, 2009, 2010, 2011
 Championnat National U17: 4
Champions: 1994, 2000, 2004, 2014
 Championnat National U19: 3
Champions: 1993, 2000, 2005
 Coupe Gambardella: 4
Champions: 1971, 1994, 1997, 2022
Finalists: 1970, 1992, 2005, 2006, 2015
 Coupe Nationale U16 (with Rhône-Alpes): 2
Champions: 1960, 1996
 French Division 3: 1
Champions: 1993

Staff 
 National 2 Manager:  Gueida Fofana
 U-19 Manager:  Eric Hély
 U-17 Manager:  Amaury Barlet
 Sporting Coordinator:  Guy Genet

References 

Reserves and Academy
Football academies in France
French reserve football teams
UEFA Youth League teams